Sovia is a genus of grass skipper butterflies in the family Hesperiidae. The species are found in the Indomalayan realm
The genus was erected by William Harry Evans in 1949

Species
Sovia lucasii  (Mabille, 1876)  – Sikkim China
 S. l. magna Evans, 1932  
Sovia separata (Moore, 1882)  – Sikkim, Tibet
Sovia albipectus  (de Nicéville, 1891)  
Sovia subflava  (Leech, 1894)  – West Sichuan, Northwest Yunnan 
Sovia grahami (Evans, 1926)  
S. g. grahami Tibet, Assam  
S. g. miliaohuae Huang, 2003 – Northwest Yunnan 
Sovia fangi Huang & Wu, 2003 – Yunnan 
Sovia hyrtacus  (de Nicéville, 1897)  - bicolor ace
Sovia malta  Evans, 1949  Manipur
Sovia eminens  Devyatkin, 1996  Vietnam

Biology 
The larvae feed on Gramineae and Hibisceae including Kydia calycina

References

Natural History Museum Lepidoptera genus database

External links
Sovia at Markku Savela's ''Lepidoptera and Some Other Life Forms'

Hesperiinae
Hesperiidae genera